Gile Flowage is a lake in the U.S. state of Wisconsin, located south of the city of Montreal.

In 1967, the Wisconsin state record Black crappie was caught in the Gile Flowage.

Fishing is regulated by the Wisconsin DNR.

See also
 List of lakes in Wisconsin

References

Lakes of Iron County, Wisconsin